Diplomacy is the art and practice of conducting negotiations between representatives of states.

Diplomacy also may refer to:

Arts and entertainment 
 Diplomacy (book), a 1994 book by Henry Kissinger
 Diplomatie (play), 2011 play by Cyril Gély

Films 
 Diplomacy (1916 film), 1916 silent film by Sidney Olcott
 Diplomacy (1926 film), 1926 American silent film by Marshall Neilan
 Diplomacy (2014 film), 2014 Franco-German film by Volker Schlöndorff, based on  the 2011 play

Games 
 Diplomacy (game), a World War I themed strategic board game by Allan B. Calhamer
 Diplomacy (computer game), a turn-based computer strategy game
 Diplomacy, second "micro-expansion" to the PC strategy game Sins of a Solar Empire

Unconventional approaches to diplomatic goals 
 Indirect methods:
 Citizen diplomacy
 Ping-pong diplomacy
 Belligerent methods:
 Gunboat diplomacy
 Cowboy diplomacy
 New technologies:
 Facebook diplomacy 
 Internet  diplomacy
 Economic diplomacy
 Preventive diplomacy
 Public diplomacy
 Shuttle diplomacy
 Track II diplomacy
 Transformational Diplomacy

See also
:Category:Types of diplomacy
:Category:Diplomacy